In classical heraldry, vert is the tincture equivalent to the colour "green". It is one of the five dark tinctures (colours). The word vert is simply the French word for "green". It is used in English in the sense of a heraldic tincture since the early 16th century. 
In Modern French, vert is not used as a heraldic term. Instead, the French heraldic term for green tincture is sinople. This has been the case since c. the 16th century. In medieval French heraldry, vert also meant "green" while sinople was a shade of red.
Vert is portrayed by the conventions of heraldic "hatching" (in black and white engravings) by lines at a 45-degree angle from upper left to lower right, or indicated by the abbreviation vt. when a coat of arms is tricked.

The colour green is commonly found in modern flags and coat of arms, and to a lesser extent also in the classical heraldry of the Late Middle Ages and the Early Modern period.
Green flags were historically carried by Ottokar II of Bohemia in the 13th century. In the modern period, a Green Ensign was flown by Irish vessels, becoming a symbol of Irish nationalism in the 19th and 20th century. The Empire of Brazil used a yellow rhombus on a green field from 1822, now seen in the flag of Brazil. In the 20th century, a green field was chosen for a number of national flag  designs, especially in the Arab and Muslim world because of the symbolism of green in Islam, including the solid green flag of the Libyan Arab Jamahiriya (1977).

Sometimes, the different tinctures are said to be connected with special meanings or virtues, and represent certain elements and precious stones. Even if this is an idea mostly disregarded by serious heraldists throughout the centuries, it may be of anecdotal interest to see what they are, since the information may be used for poetic purposes. Many sources give different meanings, but the vert tincture is said to represent the following:
 of jewels, the emerald;
 of heavenly bodies, Venus.

Middle Ages
The green tincture was left out of some heraldic works in the Middle Ages, but the first known English treatise, the Anglo-Norman "De Heraudie" (dated to sometime between 1230 and 1345), lists vert among the other tinctures.

The French term sinople  was in use prior to the 15th century, but it did not refer to green, but rather to red, being identical in origin to Cinnabar, originally the name of a red pigment also known as sinopia. 
Descriptions of knightly shields as painted at least partly green in  Arthurian romance  are found earlier, even in the late 12th century. Here, the  Chevalier au Vert Escu ("knight with the green shield") often marks a kind of supernatural character outside of normal chivalric society (as is still the case with the English "Green Knight" of c. 1390), perhaps in connection with the Wild Man or Green Man of medieval figurative art.
The Anglo-Norman prose Brut (c. 1200) has Brutus of Troy bear a green shield, Brutus Vert-Escu, Brutus Viride Scutum.

Green is occasionally found in historical coats of arms (as opposed to the fictional "green knights" of Arthurian romance) from as early as the 13th century, but it remained rare, and indeed actively avoided,  well into the 15th century, but becomes more common in the classical heraldry of the 16th and 17th centuries.

According to Dr. Paweł Dudziński, the chairman of Heraldic Committee within Polish Ministry of Interior and Administration, early heraldic green used to be bright, obtained from verdigris pigment, which allowed contrast with azure (obtained from dark ultramarine pigment) in arms that contravened the rule of tincture.

An early example of a green escutcheon was that of the coat of arms of Styria, based on the banner of Ottokar II of Bohemia (r. 1253–1278), described by chronist Ottokar aus der Gaal (c. 1315) as:
ein banier grüene als ein gras / darin ein pantel swebte / blanc, als ob ez lebte
"a banner green as grass, therein suspended a panther in white, [depicted] as if alive."
A curious example occurs in an early armorial of the Burgundian Order of the Knights of the Golden Fleece (Toison d'Or) where the arms of the Lannoy family are recorded as "argent, three lions rampant sinople, etc."  Despite the fact that sinople signified a shade of red in early heraldry, the lions in this 15th century manuscript are clearly green, although rather faded.  The fugitive nature of the green pigments of that day may have had some influence on the low use of that color in early heraldry.

Classical heraldry
During the 16th century, green was still rare as a tincture for the field of a coat of arms, but it was used increasingly for the heraldic designs shown in the field, especially when depicting trees or other vegetation.  Thus,  the coat of arms of Hungary  shows a  "double cross on a hill" as a symbol of the Árpád kings, where the cross was shown in silver (argent) and the hill in green, from the late 14th century.

The only green shown in the arms of the states of the Holy Roman Empire in the Quaternion Eagle by Hans Burgkmair (c. 1510) are the crancelin of Saxony and the Zirbelnuss of Augsburg.
The three lions rampant, verts of the Marquessate of Franchimont are attested in the 16th century.

Siebmachers Wappenbuch of 1605 shows a number of green heraldic devices in the coat of arms of cities. For example, the coat of arms of the town of Waldkappel ("forest chapel") as depicting a chapel in a forest on a red field, with the ground on which the chapel is standing, and four trees behind the chapel, drawn in green.
There are a number of other examples where Siebmacher as a green "mount" (the heraldic "hill" at the bottom of the shield on which the heraldic charge is "standing"). 
For the town of Grünberg, Siebmacher shows a yellow field on which a knight is riding, his horse running on a green "hill" and the knight flying a green banner.

Gallery

Modern flags

Historically, a Green Ensign was flown by Irish merchant vessels from the late 17th century.
Green flags flown by revolutionary uprisings include that used in the Vaudois  insurrection against Bernese rule in the 1790s (which became the basis of the modern coat of arms of Vaud), the flag of the Irish Saint Patrick's Battalion (1846-1848) and Easter Rising (1916).

In the 20th century, a number of national flags were designed involving green, especially in the Muslim world, based on the traditional symbolism of green in Islam, and as one of the Pan-Arab colours. 
Green is also common among the national flags of African countries; green is one of the Pan-African colours.  
Other countries have used the colour green in their flags to represent the "greenness" of their lands and abundance of their nation.

The following contemporary national flags feature a solid green field: 
the Flag of Brazil (1889, Empire of Brazil from 1822):  a yellow rhombus on a green field, in the rhombus a blue disc depicting a starry sky spanned by a curved band inscribed with the national motto,
the flag of Pakistan (1947): a white star and crescent on a dark green field, with a vertical white stripe at the hoist,
the flag of Mauritania (1959): green, with a golden upward-pointed crescent and star,
the flag of Zambia (1964): green, at the fly end stripes in red, black and orange and a depiction of an eagle,
the flag of Bangladesh (1972): a red disc on a green field
the flag of Saudi Arabia (1973): green, with the shahada inscription and a sword in white.
the flag of Dominica (1978): green, a cross in yellow, black and white, and a red disc with a depiction of the  sisserou parrot,
the Flag of Turkmenistan (2001): green, with a vertical red stripe near the hoist side,  a white waxing crescent moon  and five white five-pointed stars appear in the upper corner of the field just to the fly side of the red stripe.

Former national flags with green fields further include the solid green flag of the Libyan Arab Jamahiriya (1977-2011).

References

Brault, Gerard J. (1997). Early Blazon: Heraldic Terminology in the Twelfth and Thirteenth Centuries, (2nd ed.). Woodbridge, UK: The Boydell Press. .

External links

Colours (heraldry)
Shades of green